The Helvetia Cup or European B Team Championships was a European mixed team championship in badminton. The first Helvetia Cup tournament took place in Zurich, Switzerland in 1962. The tournament took place every two years from 1971 until 2007, after which it was dissolved.

Past winners

References

 
Badminton tournaments in Europe
International badminton competitions
European international sports competitions
Recurring events established in 1962
Recurring events disestablished in 2007
1962 establishments in Europe
2007 disestablishments in Europe